The Liberian Bank for Development and Investment (LBDI) is a full-service bank of Liberia. It was founded in 1961 and it is based in Monrovia.  The bank is involved in consumer banking as well as in development banking.

Operations
LBDI has 12 branch offices in Liberia.  In the field of consumer banking, the bank offers internet banking and Western Union service.

The bank has three executive officers:
Mr. John B.S. Davies III ---- President/CEO
Ms. Gloria Y. Menjor --- General Manager/DCEO
Mrs. Clavenda O. Payman --- Comptroller/CFO

External links
Liberian Bank for Development and Investment official site

Banks of Liberia
Economy of Monrovia
Banks established in 1961